Joseph Peters may refer to: 

 J. Peters, American communist
Josef Peters (racing driver) (1914-2001), racing driver from Düsseldorf, Germany,
Joe Peters, American glass artist

See also
Joseph Peterson (disambiguation)